Divaina is a Sinhala language daily newspaper published by the Upali Newspapers in Sri Lanka. A sister newspaper of The Island , Divaina was established in 1981. Its Sunday edition is the Sunday Divaina. The daily newspaper currently has a circulation of 156,000 and its Sunday edition, 340,000 per issue. The paper was founded by Upali Wijewardene, and it takes a Sinhalese Buddhist nationalist editorial stance.

See also
List of newspapers in Sri Lanka

References

External links
Divaina official Website
Sri Lanka Newspapers

Daily newspapers published in Sri Lanka
Publications established in 1981
Sinhala-language newspapers published in Sri Lanka
Upali Newspapers